George William Skinner (February 14, 1925 – October 26, 2008) was an American anthropologist and scholar of China.  Skinner was a proponent of the spatial approach to Chinese history, as explained in his Presidential Address to the Association for Asian Studies in 1984. He often referred to his approach as "regional analysis," and taught the use of maps as a key class of data in ethnography.

Early life
Skinner was born on February 14, 1925, in Oakland, California. His father, John James Skinner was a pharmacologist and his mother, Eunice Engle Skinner, taught music and became the director of music education for the Berkeley school system; his sister, Jane Skinner Hardester, became a noted choral conductor. Skinner spent two years at Deep Springs College, a small college founded to educate small cohorts of young men into the life of the mind in a self-sufficient, disciplined manner. After Deep Springs, he joined the Navy V-12 Program in 1943, then attended the U.S. Navy Oriental Language School for 18 months at the University of Colorado, Boulder, where he studied Chinese. In 1946, Skinner headed for Cornell University to complete his B.A. degree. He graduated in the following year with his B.A. (with distinction) in Far Eastern Studies, and remained there for his Ph.D. in anthropology (1954) under the supervision of Lauriston Sharp.

Academic career
Skinner's first job was as instructor in sociology at Cornell in 1949. Late in that year he flew to Chengdu, in China's Sichuan province, to conduct doctoral dissertation research on the structure of markets in the Chengdu Plain. Skinner's research was cut short by the arrival of the People's Liberation Army, which confiscated his notes, but the experience became the basis of his later work on spatial modelling. A copy of his field notes on village life in and around Gaodianzi and pre-revolution Chengdu were later discovered and published in 2017 as Rural China on the Eve of Revolution: Sichuan Fieldnotes, 1949–1950. Skinner proceeded to Bangkok, Thailand, where he researched a substitute doctoral topic, the social structure of the Chinese community in Thailand. This research was published in his first two books, Chinese Society in Thailand (1957) and Leadership and Power in the Chinese Community of Thailand (1958) 

Between 1951 and 1955, he was field director of the Cornell Southeast Asia Program, then a research associate at Cornell. He became assistant professor of anthropology at Columbia University in 1958. Two years later, Skinner was hired back at Cornell as associate professor and then promoted to full professor in 1962 — an unusually fast track to that status. In 1965, he left for Stanford University, moving again in 1990 to the University of California, Davis, which had hired his wife, China historian Susan L. Mann. Skinner retired from teaching in 2005 but maintained an active research program until his death three years later.

Research
Perhaps his best-known influence on Chinese Studies was his delineation of the Physiographic macroregions of China.  In later years he was instrumental in the establishment of the China Historical Geographic Information Systems project at Harvard and Fudan Universities.  His papers and maps are archived in the library collections of Harvard, Cornell, the University of Washington, and Fudan University.

Publications
Books and monographs
 Report on the Chinese in Southeast Asia. Ithaca: Cornell University, Southeast Asia Program, 1951. 91 pp. (Data papers 1).
 (General editor) The Social Sciences and Thailand. Bangkok: Cornell Research Center, 1956. 185 + 125 pp. (in Thai and English).
 Chinese Society in Thailand: An Analytical History. Ithaca: Cornell University Press, 1957. xvii + 459 pp. (Japanese edition: Bangkok: Japanese Chamber of Commerce, 1973, 365 pp.).
 Leadership and Power in the Chinese Community of Thailand. Ithaca: Cornell University Press, 1958. xvii +363 pp. (Monographs of the Association for Asian Studies, III). (Japanese edition: Tokyo: Ajia Keizai Kenkyujo, 1961. 417 pp.). (Reprinted 1979 by Universities Microfilm International).
 (Editor) Local, Ethnic, and National Loyalties in Village Indonesia: A Symposium. New Haven: Yale University, Southeast Asia Studies, 1959. 68 pp.
 (Editor) Modern Chinese Society: An Analytical Bibliography, Vol. 1, Publications in Western Languages, 1644–1972. Stanford: Stanford University Press, 1973. 1xxviii + 802 pp.
 (Editor, with Winston Hsieh) Modern Chinese Society: An Analytical Bibliography, Vol. 2, Publications in Chinese, 1644–1969. Stanford University Press, 1973. lxxci + 802 pp.
 (Editor, with Shigeaki Tomita) Modern Chinese Society: An Analytical Bibliography, Vol. 3, Publications in Japanese, 1644–1971. Stanford: Stanford University Press, 1973. 1xix + 531 pp.
 (Editor, with Mark Elvin) The Chinese City Between Two Worlds. Stanford: Stanford University Press, 1974. xiii + 458 pp.
 (Editor, with A. Thomas Kirsch) Change and Persistence in Thai Society: Essays in Honor of Lauriston Sharp. Ithaca: Cornell University Press, 1975. 386 pp.
 (Editor) The City in Late Imperial China. Stanford: Stanford University Press, 1977. xvii + 820 pp.
 (Editor) The Study of Chinese Society: Essays by Maurice Freedman. Stanford: Stanford University Press, 1979. xxiv + 491 pp.
 Rural China on the Eve of Revolution. University of Washington Press, 2017. 280 pp.

Articles and book chapters
 Aftermath of Communist liberation in the Chengtu Plain. Pacific Affairs 24, 1 (Mar. 1951): 61–76.
 The new sociology of China. Far Eastern Quarterly 14, 4 (Aug. 1951): 365–371.
 Peasant organization in rural China. Annals of the American Academy of Political and Social Science 277 (Sept. 1951): 89–100.
 A study in miniature of Chinese population. Population Studies 5, 2 (Nov. 1951): 91–103. (Reprinted in Social Demography, edited by Thomas R. Ford and Gordon F. De Jong. Englewood Cliffs, NJ: Prentice-Hall, 1970, 642–656.)
 Cultural values, social structure and population growth. Population Bulletin of the United Nations 5 (July 1956): 5–12.
 The unity of the social sciences. In The Social Sciences and Thailand. Bangkok: Cornell Research Center, 1956, 3–6. (In Thai and English).
 Chinese assimilation and Thai politics. Journal of Asian Studies 16, 2 (Feb. 1957): 237–250. (Reprinted in Southeast Asia: The Politics of National Integration, edited by John T. McAlister, Jr. New York: Random House, 1973, 383–398.)
 The Chinese of Java. In Colloquium on Overseas Chinese, edited by Morton H. Fried. New York: Institute of Pacific Relations, 1958, 1–10.
 Overseas Chinese in Southeast Asia. Annals of the American Academy of Political and Social Science 321 (Jan. 1959): 136–147.
 The nature of loyalties in rural Indonesia. In Local, Ethnic and National Loyalties in Village Indonesia: A Symposium. New Haven: Yale University, Southeast Asia Studies, 1959, 1–11. (Reprinted in Social Change: The Colonial Situation, edited by Immanuel M. Wallerstein. New York: Wiley, 1966, 265–277.)
 Change and persistence in Chinese culture overseas: A comparison of Thailand and Java. Journal of the South Seas Society 16 (1960): 86100. (Reprinted in Readings in South-east Asian Anthropology, edited by Donald J. Tugby. Brisbane: University of Queensland Press, 1967. Reprinted in Southeast Asia: The Politics of National Integration, edited by John T. McAlister, Jr. New York: Random House, 1973, 399–415.)
 Java's Chinese minority: Continuity and change. Journal of Asian Studies 20, 3 (May 1961): 353–362.
 The Chinese minority. In Indonesia, edited by Ruth T. McVey. New Haven: HRAF Press, 1963, 97–117. (Indonesian translation: Golongan minoritas Tionghoa. In Golongan Etnis Tionghoa di Indonesia, edited by Mely G. Tan. Jakarta: Penderbit PT Gramedia, 1979, 1–29.)
 What the study of China can do for social science. Journal of Asian Studies 23, 4 (Aug. 1964): 517–522. [Chinese translation in Ta-hsüeh sheng-huo (Hong Kong) 6 (1966): 8–13.]
 The Thailand Chinese: Assimilation in a changing society. Asia 2 (Autumn 1964): 80–92.
 Marketing and social structure in rural China, Parts I, II, and III. Journal of Asian Studies 24, 1 (Nov. 1964): 3–44; 24, 2 (Feb. 1965): 195–228; 24, 3 (May 1965): 363–399. (Part I reprinted in Peasant Society: A Reader, edited by Jack M. Potter et al. Boston: Little, Brown, 1967, 63–93; and in Man, Space and Environment: Concepts in Contemporary Human Geography, edited by Paul Ward English and Robert C. Mayfield. New York: Oxford University Press, 1972, 561–601. Parts I, II, and III separately reprinted in Bobbs Merrill reprint series. Reissued 1974, 1977, 1981, 1988, 1994, and 2000 as a pamphlet by the Association for Asian Studies. Japanese edition: Kyoto: Horitse Bunka Sha, 1979. 222 p.)
 Communication (on marketing systems in Communist China). Journal of Asian Studies 25, 2 (Feb. 1966): 319–324.
 Overseas Chinese leadership: Paradigm for a paradox. In Leadership and Authority, edited by Gehan Wijeyewardene. Singapore: University of Malaya Press, 1968, 191–207.
 (with Edwin A. Winckler) Compliance succession in rural Communist China: A cyclical theory. In A Sociological Reader on Complex Organization, 2nd ed., edited by Amitai Etzioni. New York: Holt, Rinehart, and Winston, 1969, 410–438.
 Chinese peasants and the closed community: An open and shut case. Comparative Studies in Society and History 13, 3 (July, 1971): 270–281.
 (with Arthur P. Wolf) Maurice Freedman (1920–75) [obituary]. China Quarterly 63 (Sept. 1975): i–iii
 Maurice Freedman, 1920–1975, and Bibliography of Maurice Freedman. American Anthropologist 78, 4 (Dec. 1976): 871–885.
 Mobility strategies in late imperial China: A regional-systems analysis. In Regional Analysis, Vol. 1. Economic Systems, edited by Carol A. Smith. New York: Academic Press, 1976, 327–364.
 Urban development in imperial China [Part One introduction]. In The City in Late Imperial China, edited by G. William Skinner. Stanford: Stanford University Press, 1977, 3–31.
 Urban and rural in Chinese society [Part Two introduction]. In The City in Late Imperial China. Stanford: Stanford University Press, 1977, 253–273.
 Urban social structure in Ch'ing China [Part Three introduction]. In The City in Late Imperial China. Stanford: Stanford University Press, 1977, 521–553.
 Regional urbanization in nineteenth-century China. In The City in Late Imperial China. Stanford: Stanford University Press, 1977, 211–249.
 Cities and the hierarchy of local systems. In The City in Late Imperial China. Stanford: Stanford University Press, 275–364. (Reprinted in Studies in Chinese Society, edited by Arthur P. Wolf. Stanford: Stanford University Press, 1978, 1–77.)
 Vegetable supply and marketing in Chinese cities. China Quarterly 76 (Dec. 1978): 733–793.
 Introduction. In The Study of Chinese Society: Essays by Maurice Freedman. Stanford: Stanford University Press, 1979, xi–xxiv.
 Vegetable supply and marketing in Chinese cities. In Vegetable Farming Systems in China, edited by Donald L. Plucknett and Halsey L. Beemer, Jr. Boulder, CO: Westview Press, 1981, 215–280.
 Chinese history and the social sciences. In Chinese Social and Economic History from the Song to 1900, edited by Albert Feuerwerker. Ann Arbor: University of Michigan, Center for Chinese Studies, 1982, 11–6.
 Asian studies and the disciplines. Asian Studies Newsletter 19, 4 (Apr. 1984).
 Rural marketing in China: Revival and reappraisal. In Markets and Marketing: Proceedings of the 1984 Meeting of the Society for Economic Anthropology, edited by Stuart Plattner. Lanham, Md: University Press of America, 1985, 7–47.
 Presidential address: The structure of Chinese history. Journal of Asian Studies 44, 2 (Feb. 1985): 271–292.
 Rural marketing in China: Repression and revival. China Quarterly 102 (Sept. 1985): 393–413.
 Sichuan's population in the nineteenth century: Lessons from disaggregated data. Late Imperial China 8, 1 (June 1987): 1–79.
 Conjugal power in Tokugawa Japanese families: A matter of life or death. In Sex and Gender Hierarchies, edited by Barbara D. Miller. New York: Cambridge University Press, 1993, 236–270.
 Differential development in Lingnan. In The Economic Transformation of South China: Reform and Development in the Post-Mao Era, edited by Thomas P. Lyons and Victor Nee. Ithaca: Cornell East Asia Program, 1994, 17–54.
 Creolized Chinese societies in Southeast Asia. In Sojourners and Settlers: Histories of Southeast Asia and the Chinese, edited by Anthony Reid. Sydney: Allen and Unwin, 1996, 50–93.
 Family systems and demographic processes. In Anthropological Demography: Toward a New Synthesis, edited by David I. Kertzer and Thomas E. Fricke. Chicago: University of Chicago Press, 1997, 53–114.
 Introduction (and maps). In Migration and Ethnicity in Chinese History: Hakkas, Pengmin, and their Neighbors, by Sow-Theng Leong. Stanford: Stanford University Press, 1997, 1–18.
 Chinese cities, then and now: The difference a century makes. In Cosmopolitan Capitalists: Hong Kong and the Chinese Diaspora at the End of the Twentieth Century. Seattle: University of Washington Press, 1999, 56–79.
 (with Mark Henderson and Yuan Jianhua) China's fertility transition through regional space: Using GIS and census data for a spatial analysis of historical demography. Social Science History 24, 3 (Fall 2000): 613–643.

Notes

Sources
 
 Daniel Little, "G. William Skinner", The China Beat 2008-17-11.

American sinologists
1925 births
2008 deaths
University of California, Davis faculty
Deep Springs College alumni
Cornell University alumni
Cornell University faculty
Stanford University Department of Anthropology faculty
Harvard University people
Members of the United States National Academy of Sciences
Presidents of the Association for Asian Studies
American expatriates in China
American expatriates in Thailand